Xuanwu Lake is located in Xuanwu District in the central-northeast part of Nanjing, Jiangsu. It is near the Nanjing Railway Station and Jiming Temple. Five islands within the lake are interconnected by arched bridges. Within the park are temples, pagodas, pavilions, gardens, teahouses, restaurants, entertainment venues, a small zoo, and other attractions. Its main entrance is the Xuanwu Gate.

History
The lake was formed, according to geologists, when tectonic plates shifted and created Mount Yanshan. A legend is that Emperor Sun Quan (182–252) settled in the Nanjing area and he had the lake created and filled with water. The lake was named for a black dragon, believed to be a water god by Chinese Taoists, from a Southern dynasty (420-859) legend. The dragon, seen in the lake, looked like a tortoise and a snake and was named Xuanwu, meaning black tortoise.

During the Six Dynasties period (222–859) a garden on a basaltic site was created, which is now considered one of the most scenic places in the park. The area was used for hunting and training by the emperor's family members.

Also called "Military Rehearsal Lake", the lake was used for naval battle exercises during the Song dynasty (960–1279). The "Yellow Book Storage", or the "Yellow Register Archives", was built there in the beginning of the Ming dynasty (1368-1644), and it was thus made an imperial garden and "forbidden land".

The lake and surrounding area was made into a park in 1911 after the end of the Qing dynasty. It was renamed from Yuanwu Lake Park to "Continental Park" in 1928 and officially made Xuanwu Lake Park in 1935. A plan was made for the 2005 creation of the Li Yu Cultural Park, Garden Park, Qingyinge pavilion and an immortality garden.

Description
The main entrance to the Xuanwu Lake Park is through Xuanwu Gate, which is part of the Nanjing City Wall that borders the south and east portions of the park and Ji Ming Temple is in its southwestern area. The Zifeng Tower overlooks the lake. Xuanwu Lake has a surface area of 3.78 square kilometers. In recent years, the amount of water diverted from the upper reaches of Xuanwu Lake has increased, and the water quality has improved, supporting many creatures.

Park
Xuanwu Lake Park, once an imperial lake garden, is now a city park. In the spring, the pink cherry blossom trees are in bloom. Summer visitors experience emerald lotus leaves, flowers, and "a peaceful haven of weeping willows" followed by red maples and golden ginkgos in the fall. Arch bridges connect five islands. The "Autumn Chrysanthemum of Liang Islet" has the Lake God Temple, Wenji Pavilion, the Peony Garden, Bonsai Museum, and a fish pond. The "Flowers Sea of Ying Islet" is sanctuary to more than 200 rare species of birds. An entertainment venue, including a bandstand, is located on "Green Islet." The "Willows and Smokes of Huanzhou Islet" has a playground for children. The fifth island is the "Clouds and Mists of Ling Islet".

Within the scenic park are pagodas, pavilions, tea houses, and restaurants. Entertainment options include boating, zoo, and an outdoor theatre. Key attractions include the Nuo’na tower, Lama Temple, cenotaph of Guo Pu, and the Rose Garden. On the lake are boats and ferries. It is also considered the "Pearl of the Stone City". If desired, a visitor could stroll through the park for up to five hours.

It is designated a National Grade AAAA Attraction. The City of Nanjing has identified it as one of the top five parks in the city. Others are Mochou Lake Park, Qingliangshan Park, Wuchaomen Park and China Gate Castle Park.

Nanjing's Couple Park, or Qinglüyuan Xuanwu, is adjacent to the western edge of Xuanwu Lake and behind the Nanjing International Exhibition Center.

References

External links

 Official site (Chinese)
 Xuanwu Lake Park map (Chinese)

Geography of Nanjing
Parks in Nanjing
Lakes of Jiangsu